Quaritch is a surname.

People
Notable people with the name include:

Bernard Quaritch (1819–1899), German-born British bookseller and bibliographer
Bernard Alfred Quaritch (1870–1913), British bookseller and collector
Horace Geoffrey Quaritch Wales (1900–1981), English historian

Fictional characters
Miles Quaritch, a character from James Cameron's Avatar franchise

Others
Colonel Quaritch, VC, an 1888 novel by H. Rider Haggard